Érik Vera Franco (born 24 March 1992) is a Mexican professional footballer who plays as a left-back for Liga MX club Querétaro.

External links
 
  
 
 

Living people
1992 births
Mexican footballers
Association football defenders
Club Universidad Nacional footballers
C.F. Mérida footballers
Venados F.C. players
Club Necaxa footballers
Atlético San Luis footballers
Alebrijes de Oaxaca players
Atlante F.C. footballers
Liga MX players
Ascenso MX players
Liga Premier de México players
Tercera División de México players
Footballers from Mexico City